General elections were held in Guatemala on 19 January 1958 after the 1957 elections were nullified. After no candidate received 50% or more of the national vote, Miguel Ydígoras Fuentes was elected President by Congress on 12 February, whilst an alliance of the National Democratic Reconciliation Party, Nationalist Democratic Party, the Nationalist Liberal Party, the Democratic National Association and the National Anti-Communist Front won 40 of the 66 seats in Congress.

Results

President

Congress

Bibliography
Villagrán Kramer, Francisco. Biografía política de Guatemala: años de guerra y años de paz. FLACSO-Guatemala, 2004. 
Political handbook of the world 1958. New York, 1959. 
Elections in the Americas A Data Handbook Volume 1. North America, Central America, and the Caribbean. Edited by Dieter Nohlen. 2005.

Elections in Guatemala
Guatemala
1958 in Guatemala
Presidential elections in Guatemala
Election and referendum articles with incomplete results